Thomas Pocock may refer to:

 Tom Pocock (1925–2007), English biographer, war correspondent, journalist and naval historian
 Thomas Pocock (clergyman) (1672–1745), English clergyman and diarist